Mandan (YTB-794) was a United States Navy  named for Mandan, North Dakota.

Construction

The contract for Mandan was awarded 15 June 1967. She was laid down on 11 December 1967 at Marinette, Wisconsin, by Marinette Marine and launched 30 April 1968.

Operational history
Mandan served at Naval Station Subic Bay, Philippines until the Vietnam war when she was reassigned to Naval Support Activity Danang, South Vietnam.  She earned campaign stars for Vietnamese Counteroffensive - Phase V, Vietnamese Counteroffensive - Phase VI, and Tet/69 Counteroffensive.  After that conflict's conclusion, Mandan returned to Subic Bay where she served out the rest of her career.

Stricken from the Navy List 5 January 2001, ex-Mandan was sunk during fleet training exercises, 27 April 2003.

References

External links
 

 

Natick-class large harbor tugs
1965 ships
Ships built by Marinette Marine
Mandan, North Dakota